Koopa usually refers to Koopa Troopas, fictional creatures from Nintendo's [[Mario (franchise)|Mario franchise]].

Koopa may also refer to:

Bowser, a video game character and the main antagonist of the Mario franchise
Koopalings, Bowser's minions
Koopa (band), an English rock band

See also
Cooper (disambiguation)